|}

The Nell Gwyn Stakes is a Group 3 flat horse race in Great Britain open to three-year-old fillies. It is run over a distance of 7 furlongs (1,408 metres) on the Rowley Mile at Newmarket in mid-April.

History
The event was established in 1961, and it was initially called the Spring Fillies' Stakes. The first running was won by Verbena.

The race was renamed the Nell Gwyn Stakes in 1962. It was named after Nell Gwyn (1650–87), a long-time mistress of King Charles II.

The Nell Gwyn Stakes can serve as a trial for various fillies' Classics in Europe. The last winner to achieve victory in the 1000 Guineas was Cachet in 2022. The last to win the Poule d'Essai des Pouliches was Valentine Waltz in 1999.

The race is currently held on the first day of Newmarket's three-day Craven Meeting. It is run the day before the Craven Stakes.

Records

Leading jockey (7 wins):
 Frankie Dettori - Crystal Gazing (1991), Valentine Waltz (1999), Fantasia (2009), Sandiva (2014), Osaila (2015), Nathra (2016), Daban (2017)

Leading trainer (8 wins):
 Sir Henry Cecil – Caspian (1973), One in a Million (1979), Evita (1980), Fairy Footsteps (1981), Chalon (1982), Oh So Sharp (1985), Martha Stevens (1987), Hot Snap (2013)

Winners

See also
 Horse racing in Great Britain
 List of British flat horse races
 Recurring sporting events established in 1961 – this race is included under its original title, Spring Fillies' Stakes.

References

 Paris-Turf:
 Racing Post:

 galopp-sieger.de – Nell Gwyn Stakes.
 ifhaonline.org – International Federation of Horseracing Authorities – Nell Gwyn Stakes (2019).
 pedigreequery.com – Nell Gwyn Stakes – Newmarket.
 

Flat horse races for three-year-old fillies
Newmarket Racecourse
Flat races in Great Britain